Archive is a membership magazine for users of the Acorn Archimedes personal computer and related  hardware. It is the oldest and longest-running  magazine.

History
The first issue was announced in September 1987 and came out in October 1987, a month before the launch of RISC User. In August 2007, Jim Nagel took over from the founding editor Paul Beverley. After the death of Jim Nagel on 21 March 2020, the editorship passed to Gavin Smith. Members of The ARM Club were offered discounted subscriptions in 1999, around the time of the discontinuation of Archimedes World and announced closure of RISC User.

See also
 (BBC) Acorn User
 The Micro User
 BEEBUG / Disc User
 Acorn Computing
 Electron User

References

References

External links
Official Website
phpArcScan, searchable index by Oddbloke

Computer magazines published in the United Kingdom
Home computer magazines
Magazines established in 1987
Monthly magazines published in the United Kingdom
Mass media in Norwich